Damon Sajnani, better known by his stage name Professor D or ProfessorD.us is a Canadian rapper and assistant professor based in the United States. He is the lead vocalist of The Dope Poet Society and professor of African Cultural Studies at the University of Wisconsin - Madison where he teaches courses on Hip Hop and Politics in Africa and around the world. He was the inaugural Nasir Jones Hip Hop Fellow at the W.E.B. Du Bois Institute at Harvard University in 2014-15.
He is known for rapping about social issues and global politics with sophisticated rhyme structures and "tongue twisting flows." Marcyliena Morgan, Executive Director of Harvard's Hiphop Archive, says Professor D's work "represents the innovations and creativity of hiphop at its best." Professor D has released several critically acclaimed albums and published numerous scholarly articles.

In December 2016, Wisconsin legislators Stephen Nass and Dave Murphy asked the University of Wisconsin to fire Sajnani and cancel his course titled The Problem of Whiteness which the legislators maintain is "adding to the polarization of the races in the state", and which they believe is premised on the idea that white people are racist. The course description states that "whiteness studies considers how race is experienced by white people. It explores how they consciously and unconsciously perpetuate institutional racism and how this not only devastates communities of color but also perpetuates the oppression of most white folks along the lines of class and gender. In this class, we will ask what an ethical white identity entails, what it means to be #woke, and consider the journal Race Traitor’s motto, “treason to whiteness is loyalty to humanity.""

References

Living people
University of Wisconsin–Madison faculty
Musicians from Toronto
21st-century Canadian rappers
Year of birth missing (living people)